The Serranía de Hornocal are a range of mountains located  from the city of Humahuaca in the Argentine province of Jujuy. Exposed in the range is the limestone formation called Yacoraite that extends from Salta, Argentina, through the Argentine Quebrada de Humahuaca, and then through the Bolivian Altiplano to Peru.

The region Quebrada de Humahuaca was declared a World Heritage Site in 2003, both for colorful mountain landscapes and the historic Inca caravan road running through the region.

References

External links

Mountains of Argentina
Landforms of Jujuy Province